Anita Palmero (13 September 1902 – 11 January 1987)  was a Spanish cabaret and tango singer, as well as an actress. Nicknamed the "Cancionista nacional", she had a successful career in Argentina.

Early life 
She was born in Ronda, Málaga, Spain in 1902 and grew up there with her four sisters. Her father, Manuel Rojas Palmero, was a theater electrician, so from a very young age, she was in contact with the art world. Her mother died in 1917 so the family moved to Casablanca for economic reasons.

Career 
In 1925, she appeared at the Romea Theatre of Madrid before touring Mexico and Cuba. In 1929, she sang the song "Botarate" in Mosaico criollo, a film by Comminetti Edmo, which was the first tango sung in film.

Death 
She died in Buenos Aires, Argentina in 1987.

Songs

Filmography 
 1929: Mosaico criollo
 1949: Fúlmine
 1950: El ladrón canta boleros
 1954: Misión en Buenos Aires

References

1902 births
1987 deaths
Tango singers
Spanish film actresses
Tonadilleras
Spanish emigrants to Argentina
20th-century Spanish actresses
20th-century Spanish singers
Burials at La Chacarita Cemetery
20th-century Spanish women singers